Wu Gang (born 1974) is a stunt coordinator and retired professional wushu taolu athlete and stuntman from China.

Career 
Wu made his international debut at the 1997 World Wushu Championships in Rome, Italy, and became the world champion in men's qiangshu. A year later, he competed in the 1998 Asian Games in Bangkok, China, and won the gold medal in men's changquan.

After his competitive career, Wu joined the Jackie Chan Stunt Team and eventually became an action director and choreographer. In 2010, he served as the stunt coordinator for The Karate Kid and was Jaden Smith's coach. In 2016 at the 53rd Golden Horse Awards, Wu won the Golden Horse Award for Best Action Design for his work on Detective Chinatown.

See also 

 List of Asian Games medalists in wushu

References

External links 

 

Living people
Chinese wushu practitioners
Hong Kong stunt performers
Wushu practitioners at the 1998 Asian Games
Asian Games medalists in wushu
Asian Games gold medalists for China
Medalists at the 1998 Asian Games
1974 births